Religion and spirituality, a pilgrimage is a long journey or search of great moral significance.  Sometimes, it is a journey to a sacred place or shrine of importance to a person's beliefs and faith. Members of every major religion participate in pilgrimages.  A person who makes such a journey is called a pilgrim.

Hinduism

Most Hindus who can afford to go on such journeys travel to numerous iconic sites including those below:

 Ainavilli
Allahabad
 Amararama
 Amarkantak
 Amarnath
 Anandashram, Kanhangad
Annavaram
Antarvedi
 Arasavalli
 Attukal
 Avittathur
 Ayodhya
 Baba Dhansar
 Badrinath
Barsana
 Basistha Ashram
Batu Caves
 Belur Math
Bhadrachalam
Bhattiprolu
 Bhavani
 Bhimashankar Temple
Biccavolu
 Vrindavan
Chebrolu, Guntur district
Chennai
 Chitrakuta
 Chidambaram 
 Dakor
 Dharmasthala
 Draksharama
 Dwaraka Pītha
 Dwarka
Dwaraka Tirumala
 Gajanan Maharaj
 Gangotri
 Gaya, India
 Ghatikachala
 Godachi Veerbhadhreshwar Temple
 Gor Khuttree
 Gosaikunda
 Govardhana matha
 Govindavadi
 Guruvayur
 Hajo
 Haridwar
 Hemkund
 Hornad, Annapurnadevi Temple
 Idagunji
Jonnawada
 Jyotirlinga
 Jyotirmath
 Kalaram Temple
Kaleshwaram
 Kalighat Temple, Kolkata
 Kancheepuram, Tamil Nadu
 Karanja Datta Mandir
 Kataragama
 Kateel
 Katra
 Kedarnath
 Kodlamane Shree Vishnumurthy Temple, Karnataka
 Kolhapur
 Kollur
 Konark
Kotappakonda
 Ksheerarama
 kuchanpally
 Kukke Subramanya Temple
 Kumararama
 Kumbakonam
 Kumbh Mela
 Kurukshetra
 Kurupuram
 Madurai Meenakshi Temple
 Kullu
 Maihar Devi
 Mahur, Renuka Devi
 Mehandipur Balaji, Rajasthan
 Mandher Devi temple in Mandhradevi
 Manikaran
 Mayapur
 Mantralayam, Raghavendr Swamy Temple
 Mount Abu
 Mount Kailash
 Mukhalingam
 Narasimha Konda
 Narayanalayam
 Narmada River
 Nashik
 Nellitheertha
 Omkareshwar
 Palani
 Pancharama Kshetras
 Panchavati
 Pandharpur
 Parshuram Kund
 Pithapuram
 Puri
 Pushkar
 Puttaparthi Sri Sathya Saibaba
 Ramatheertham
 Rameswaram
 Rishikesh
 Ryali
 Sabarimala Swamisaranam
 Salasar Balaji, churu Rajasthan
 Sangam, Srikakulam district
 Saptashrangi
 Shirdi
 Shivkhori
 Shri Kali Temple, Sanganeri Gate, Jaipur (Rajasthan)
 Shri Mahadev Mandir
 Simhachalam
 Sivagiri, Kerala
 Somarama
 Sree Padmanabhaswamy Temple, Thiruvananthapuram
 Sri Kurmam
 Sringeri Sharada Peetham
 Srirangam
 Srisailam
 Talapady
 Thanjavur
 Thiruchendur
 Thirumanthamkunnu Temple
 Thrissur
 Tirtha and Kshetra
 Tirupati
Trimbakeshwar Shiva Temple
Tripuranthakam
 Tuljapur Bhavani temple
 Udupi
 Ujjain
Undavalli, Undavalli Caves
 Vaishno Devi
 Vani (Nashik)
 Varanasi
Vijayawada, Kanaka Durga Temple
Vindhyachal
 Vithoba
 Vrindavan
 Yamunotri
 Yadagirigutta

Every category has got its own significance. It is believed that visiting  help one to attain salvation. There are four  and twelve  along with 51  in India.

Islam
 Rauzaa of Shah-e-Alam, Ahmedabad, Gujarat
 Furfura Sharif, Hooghly, West Bengal
 Hazratbal Shrine, Srinagar
 Haji Ali Dargah, Mumbai
 Dargah of Khawaja Kanoon Sahib, Madhya Pradesh
 Mazar-e-Najmi, Ujjain, Madhya Pradesh
 Buddishai Baba Dargah in Telangana
 Cheraman Perumal Juma Masjid, Kerala
 Dargah of Nizamuddin Chishti, Delhi
 Valley of Saints at Khuldabad 
 Thiruparankundram Dargah in Thiruparankundram, Tamil Nadu
 Dargah-e-Ala Hazrat - Dargah of Imam Ahmed Raza Khan Barelvi, in Bareilly, Uttar Pradesh

For example, many Sunni ulema educated in the Chishti Order were educated in Delhi, where the tomb of Nizamuddin Auliya is and where his students are well established.

During the Mughal era, Surat was a common port for Muslims across North and West India to depart for the Hajj.

Buddhism 

Amaravati Stupa and Dharanikota
Bavikonda:
Bhattiprolu:
Bodh Gaya: the place of his Enlightenment (in the current Mahabodhi Temple).
Chandavaram, Chandavaram Buddhist site:
Gudivada
 Guntupalle, Guntupalli Group of Buddhist Monuments:
Jaggayyapeta:
 Kusinara: (now Kusinagar, India) where he died.
Nagarjuna Konda:
Nelakondapalli
Rajgir: Place of the subduing of Nalagiri, the angry elephant, through friendliness. Rajgir was another major city of ancient India. It has strong connection with buddhism.
Salihundam
Sankasia: Place of the descending to earth from Tusita heaven (after a stay of 3 months teaching his mother the Abhidhamma).
Sarnath: (formally Isipathana) where he delivered his first teaching.
Sravasti: Place of the Twin Miracle, showing his supernatural abilities in performance of miracles. Sravasti is also the place where Buddha spent the largest amount of time, being a major city in ancient India.
Vaishali: Place of receiving an offering of honey from a monkey. Vaishali was the capital of the Vajjian Republic of ancient India.
Some other pilgrimage places in India and Nepal connected to the life of Gautama Buddha are: Pataliputta, Nalanda, Vikramshila, Gaya, Kapilavastu, Kosambi, Sanchi, Varanasi, Kesariya, Devadaha, Pava and Mathura, Uttar Pradesh, Dhauli Stupa, near Puri, Odisha, etc.

There are many places scattered across mainland India, where one can find the relics of ancient Mauryan and the Gupta Empire, who championed and help propagate the Buddhist faith across most of India, South East and far East Asian countries.

Jainism

 North India: Hastinapur, Taxila, and Ashtapada
 South India: Shravanabelagola, Moodabidri, Humbaj, Anantnath Swami Temple near Kalpetta
 Eastern India: Shikharji, Pawapuri, Champa, Pundravardhan
 Western India: Palitana, Girnar, Mount Abu, Mahavirji, Shankheshwar, Mahudi
 Central India: Vidisha, Kundalpur, Sonagir

Zoroastrianism
The Zoroastrians take pilgrimage trips in India to the eight Atash Behrams in India and one in Yazd.

Christianity
 Goa. St. Francis Xavier
 St. Thomas Mount. Place where St. Thomas was martyred, Chennai, Tamilnadu, India.
 St. Thomas Syro-Malabar Church, Malayattoor is one of the eight international shrines in the world, situated in Malayattoor Angamaly, Ernakulam district of Kerala, India.
 Basilica of Our Lady of Good Health, Velankanni. 16th-century Marian apparition site, Velankanni, Tamilnadu, India.
  St. Thomas Church, Thumpoly  Alleppey kerala.
 Our lady of Assumption Church, Poomkavu Alleppey, kerala.
 Thodupuzha. Divine Mercy Shrine of Holy Mary - Marian apparition site.
 Shrine of the Infant Jesus, Nashik, Maharashtra.
 St. Jude Shrine, Jhansi
 Mount Mary Church, Bandra, Mumbai, Maharashtra
 St Peter's and St Paul's Orthodox church (Parumala church), Parumala, Kerala.
 St George Orthodox church, Puthupally.
 Kattachira St Mary's Orthodox Church.
 Niranam St Mary's Orthodox church.
St. Mary's Syro-Malabar Catholic Church, Bharananganam, tomb of Saint Alphonsa, the first woman of Indian origin to be canonised as a saint by the Catholic Church, and the first canonised saint of the Syro-Malabar Church
 St. Joseph's Pilgrim Church, Peringuzha, Muvattupuzha, Kerala

Pilgrimage in India
Lists of pilgrimage sites in India